Kevin Whyman (4 October 1975 – 1 August 2015) was an English rower and air pilot. Whyman died in an aviation accident at the 2015 CarFest.

Whyman rowed for the King's School Rowing Club. In 1996 and 1997, he was the cox for The Boat Race-winning Cambridge team.

Whyman was a Royal Air Force trained pilot and a member of the Gnat Display Team.

Death
On 1 August, 2015, Whyman died in an aviation accident when the display aircraft he was piloting crashed during a synchro exercise at the CarFest North event at Oulton Park in Cheshire. Whyman was performing with the Gnat Display Team at the time of his death.

References

English male rowers
1975 births
2015 deaths
Cambridge University Boat Club rowers
Aviators killed in aviation accidents or incidents in England
English aviators
Coxswains (rowing)
Sportspeople from Chester
Military personnel from Chester
20th-century Royal Air Force personnel
Royal Air Force airmen